Chesapeake and Ohio Depot may refer to:

 Ashland, Kentucky station (Chesapeake and Ohio Railway)
 Chesapeake and Ohio Depot (Catlettsburg, Kentucky)
 Charleston, West Virginia (Amtrak station)
 Charlottesville station (Chesapeake and Ohio Railway)
 Clifton Forge (Amtrak station), Virginia
 Culpeper (Amtrak station)
 Hinton (Amtrak station), West Virginia
 Lee Hall Depot, Newport News, Virginia
 Chesapeake and Ohio Depot (Marlinton, West Virginia)
 Maysville (Amtrak station), Kentucky
 Chesapeake and Ohio Depot (Mount Sterling, Kentucky)
 Chesapeake and Ohio Depot (Petoskey, Michigan)
 Chesapeake and Ohio Depot (Pikeville, Kentucky)
 Prince (Amtrak station), West Virginia
 Chesapeake and Ohio Depot (St. Albans, West Virginia)
 Thurmond (Amtrak station), West Virginia
 White Sulphur Springs (Amtrak station), West Virginia